Rasudan Chkonia (born 25 April 1978 in Tbilisi) is a Georgian film director. She directed the 2012 film Keep Smiling.

References

1978 births
Living people
People from Tbilisi
Film directors from Georgia (country)
21st-century women from Georgia (country)